The Diving competition at the 2010 Central American and Caribbean Games was being held in Mayagüez, Puerto Rico.

The tournament was scheduled to be held from 19–24 July at the Natatorio RUM in Mayagüez.

Medal summary

Men's events

Women's events

References

External links

Events at the 2010 Central American and Caribbean Games
July 2010 sports events in North America
2010 in diving
2010